The Fourth Direction is a 2015 Punjabi-language Indian drama film directed by Gurvinder Singh. It is based on the short stories The Fourth Direction and I Am Feeling Fine Now from Indian author Waryam Singh Sandhu's 2005 collection Chauthi Koot. The film is produced by Kartikeya Narayan Singh and is set around the Sikh separatist movement of the 1980s.

It was screened in the Un Certain Regard section at the 2015 Cannes Film Festival. It won the Silver Screen Award at the Singapore International Film Festival for Best Asian Feature Film in December 2015.

The film was shot mostly around Amritsar and Ferozepur in Punjab, India.

Plot
The film plot synthesises two different stories set in a post-Operation Blue Star Punjab in the '80s. Fear and paranoia pervade the atmosphere as the general public is caught between excesses of both Khalistani militants and the Indian government forces fighting them. The first story is about a militant diktat in Punjab that prohibited family-owned dogs from barking, and the other is about two Hindu friends travelling to Amritsar in a nearly empty train. The film merges the two plots into one by making one of the friends travelling in the train recount the first story.

The film opens with two Hindu friends Jugal and Raj looking for a train to Amritsar late in the evening. Having missed the last passenger train, they, along with a Sikh man in the same position, force their way onto a freight train. The small compartment already has a security man and two other young Sikhs besides a couple of train employees. The fearful atmosphere makes Jugal recount to Raj an earlier incident involving him, his wife and their young daughter.

The film goes into flashback. Lost at night in the countryside, Jugal, his wife and daughter reach a farmhouse in the outskirts of the village. While they are frightened to knock at the isolated house, they are not left with much choice. The family in the house, also suspicious at first, later lets them in, as the head of the house Joginder shows them the direction to take.

Later at night, Joginder and his family are visited by the Sikh militants who demand Joginder that he kill the family dog for drawing attention with its incessant barking. The family woes continue the next morning when the paramilitary men arrive looking for the separatists. They turn the house upside down before leaving.

The narrative moves back to the train on its way as the guard asks his unwanted passengers to leave before anyone notices them.

Cast
 Suvinder Vicky as Joginder
 Rajbir Kaur
 Harleen Kaur
 Taranjit Singh
 Kanwaljeet Singh as Jugal
 Harnek Aulakh
 Gurpreet Bhangu as grandmother
 Tejpal Singh as Sikh Passenger

Reception
The film premiered at Debussy Theatre in Cannes to a full house where it received a ten minute standing ovation, reported film critic Uma Da Cunha in The Citizen. She noted "the film excels in the minimal devices it uses for dramatising what it says, relying on facial expressions, individual responses and a simple unveiling of events to convey its harrowing story" adding that "The technical skills in every aspect of the film is what hits the viewer. The visuals impress and linger, the clarity of sound enhances every moment, and the striking music track resounds in the silence attached to the visuals."

Reviewing the film for Variety magazine, Jay Weissberg called it "handsome yet ineffectual take on Hindu-Sikh tensions in the 1980s" adding that "formalist attractions don’t equal dramatic strengths in the film." "While he succeeds in capturing the crushing unease of the countryside, full of uncertain, frightened glances, Singh neglects dramatic construction, jeopardizing audience empathy," Weissberg wrote.

In her review for The Hollywood Reporter Deborah Young wrote that the film "takes a very roundabout route in portraying the fear, paranoia and violence of the 1980’s" while "offering an insider’s glimpse into the rural Sikh community in India’s Punjab". Commenting on the minimalist style of the movie, she wrote that "working in miniature..the film pays a steep price in terms of a drama that involved thousands of violent deaths and lead to the assassination of Indira Gandhi."

"Singh’s directorial choices are often remarkably effective, whether in the camera angles, the long travelling shots, the nervous tension and insecurity transmitted in every glance and reflected in every silence and echoed in every sound," wrote Dan Fainaru for Screen Daily while commenting on the pace of the movie as "self-indulgent". "Prolonged sequences and themes repetitively overstated – risk alienating viewers to the point where 30 minutes less would be so much more," he wrote in his review.

Accolades

References

External links

2015 films
Indian drama films
Films based on short fiction
Films shot in Punjab, India
Insurgency in Punjab in fiction
Punjabi-language Indian films
2010s Punjabi-language films
Films based on multiple works
Films about Sikhism
Best Punjabi Feature Film National Film Award winners
National Film Development Corporation of India films
2015 drama films